Operation Baawar (Pashto for assurance), was a major Afghan-led offensive in Afghanistan west of the city of Kandahar.  The operation took place primarily in a sector known as the Horn of Panjwaii. The combat operation started on December 5, 2010.  Canadian troops from Task Force Kandahar, including those from the 1st Battalion Royal 22e Régiment Battle Group, worked with the Afghan National Army's 1st Brigade of the 205th (Hero) Corps as part of the larger Operation Hamkari.  Part of Operation Baawar included Canadian and Afghan engineering units building  of road between Mushan and Sperwan Ghar.

Timeline of battle

On December 7, 2010, soldiers from the Royal 22e Régiment had taken a Taliban stronghold in the district of Zangabad south-west of the city of Kandahar. The Canadian troops in Zangabad were supported by Leopard 2A6M tanks from 12e Régiment blindé du Canada and engineers.

On December 18, Corporal Steve Martin, from 3rd Battalion, Royal 22e Régiment, serving with 1st Battalion, Royal 22e Régiment Battle Group, was killed by an improvised explosive device in the Panjwai district of Kandahar Province.  He was reportedly patrolling on foot near the new road being built in the area when the blast occurred.

References

2010 in Afghanistan
2011 in Afghanistan
2012 in Afghanistan
2013 in Afghanistan
2014 in Afghanistan
Conflicts in 2010
Conflicts in 2011
Conflicts in 2012
Conflicts in 2013
Conflicts in 2014
History of Kandahar Province
Baawar
History of Kandahar